The Manchester Murals are a series of twelve paintings by Ford Madox Brown in the Great Hall of Manchester Town Hall and are based on the history of Manchester. Following the success of Brown's painting Work he was commissioned to paint six murals for its Great Hall. Another six murals were to be completed by Frederic Shields who later withdrew, leaving Brown to complete all twelve works. The murals were begun in 1879, towards the end of Brown's career, but were not completed until 1893, the year he died. During this period he moved from London to Manchester with his family, first living in Crumpsall and then Victoria Park.

Location

The murals form part of the decoration of the Great Hall, the central room designed by Alfred Waterhouse. On entering the hall, six murals are on the left hand wall and six on the right, progressing chronologically from the left wall nearest the entrance to the right wall opposite, repeating the basic structure of the scheme of William Bell Scott's murals on the history of Northumbria in Wallington Hall.

Subjects and meaning
The subjects chosen reflect the Victorian ideals through which the history of Manchester was seen, focusing on Christianity, commerce and the textile industry. The artist did a great deal of research to check the details for accuracy and he wrote their descriptions.

Recent commentators have identified satirical and critical features in the compositions which complicate any simple explanation of the paintings as expressions of "Victorian ideals" that the chosen subjects imply. The art historian Julie F. Codell refers to these as the "pratfalls and penultimates" of history, as opposed to its stately progress.

Most of the paintings contain Hogarthian satire (in contrast to Bell Scott's works). In the first picture the wife of the Roman general wearing a blond wig distracts him from his work; their son – a Caligula in the making – kicks an African servant. The painting that seems to celebrate industrial technology, John Kay: Inventor of the Fly Shuttle, depicts the hysterical inventor fleeing from an unruly mob which is bent on destroying the machine. Instead of culminating in the achievement of modern Manchester, the sequence concludes with a rustic scene in a small village. According to Codell, history is portrayed as fragmented, contested, and as ending in a "penultimate" moment. This may be related to Brown's interest in anarchism and William Morris's utopian socialism at the time, but it also arises from disputes about the more modern subjects. Paintings depicting the Peterloo Massacre in 1819 and the end of the Lancashire Cotton Famine in 1865 had been proposed, but were rejected by the council's committee as too controversial.

Technique
All but the last four murals were painted directly on to the wall. They were not created using the true fresco process but taking advantage of a Victorian technique, the Gambier Parry process, which was "spirit" based producing a more hard-wearing image. Brown completed the last four murals on canvas, after he had returned to live in London.

Murals

References

External links

Ford Madox Brown Murals on the Manchester City Council website
The Manchester Murals Paintings by Hall Caine, The Magazine of Art, February 1882

Culture in Manchester
Paintings by Ford Madox Brown
Murals in the United Kingdom
Paintings in Manchester